V-2 rocket facilities were military installations associated with Nazi Germany's V-2 SRBM ballistic missile, including bunkers and small launch pads which were never operationally used.

Development, testing, and production facilities
V-2 research was conducted at the Peenemünde Army Research Center with most Peenemünde test launches conducted from Test Stand VII.  After having moved the launch training facility named "Heimat-Artillerie-Park 11 Karlshagen/Pomerania" from Köslin near Peenemünde, the Training and Testing Battery 444 conducted "live warhead trials" from the Heidelager military area near Blizna, Poland, into the target area at the Pripet Marshes  to the northeast.  With the advances by the Russian armies, the Blizna testing was evacuated on September 8, 1944, to the Heidekraut testing-ground in the Tuchola Forest in Polish Pomerania.  In mid-January 1945, testing moved to the forests to the south of Wolgast, and then to the area of Rethun on the Weser river west of Hannover though no launches were conducted from either location.  Plans for production facilities at Demag-Fahrzeugwerke in Berlin-Falkensee, Raxwerke, and the Zeppelin Works in Friedrichshafen were never completed.  The initial production plant at Peenemünde and the plant's forced laborers were transferred to the Mittelwerk underground plant and nearby Dora camp of KZ Dachau to produce the operational V-2 rockets.  Near the Mittelwerk was a servomotor production facility in a salt mine and a quality control facility at Ilfeld.

After the Operation Hydra bombing of the Peenemünde Army Research Center, the supersonic wind tunnel was moved to Kochel and engine testing and calibration was moved to Lehesten.   Near the end of World War II in Europe, Peenemünde scientists were evacuated to the Alpine Fortress A research and test facility planned since early 1944 in the Austrian Alps (under the codename Salamander) were never implemented; the target areas would have been in the Tatra Mountains, the Arlberg range, and the area of the Ortler mountain.  V-2 rocket documents and drawings were hidden in a mine at Dörnten (14 tons from Peenemünde) and buried at Bad Sachsa (260 lbs from Walter Dornberger's headquarters at Schwedt-an-der-Oder).

Launch and support facilities

Initial plans for large launch bunkers at Watten and Wizernes with a radar station at Prédefin were abandoned due to the Allied bombing targeted against them.  Additional plans for small launch bunkers such as at Thiennes on the edge of the Foret de la Nieppe, at Rauville, and at Colombières near Trévières; as well as for exposed concrete pads (39 north of the Somme and 6 in Western Normandy) were switched to use firings from mobile launch platforms instead.  Mobile launching sites included the Haagse Bos and the Duindigt Racecourse at The Hague.

Eight main storage dumps were planned and four had been completed by July 1944. These were all captured before being used.  The storage depot at Mery-sur-Oise was bombed on August 2, 1944. Work had been started in August 1943 and completed by February 1944;  and the depots (including those at Bergueneuse and Villiers-Adam) included "service buildings for testing V2 sub-assemblies in the vertical position".  Testing of production motors at the Southern Works was originally conducted in late 1943 at Oberraderach near Friedrichshafen, but was shut down shortly after going into operation because firings were visible from Switzerland across Lake Constance. Raxwerke motor testing equipment was eventually moved to the Redl-Zipf facility in central Austria, which used forced labor of the Schlier-Redl-Zipf subcamp of the Mauthausen-Gusen concentration camp.

Liquid oxygen was produced at the motor testing facilities at Oberraderach (900 tons/month), in the Redl-Zipf (2,100 tons/month) tunnel (for testing the Linke-Hofmann combustion chambers), and at Lehesten near Nordhausen—two additional underground plants for 6,000 tons/month at Wittringen in the Saar (captured December 7, 1944) and near the Mittelwerk were never completed. In Belgium, an underground plant at Liège (900 tons/month) supplied launches in the Netherlands, and plants at La Louviere, Torte, and Willebroeck were also targets of allied bombing.

V-2 suppliers
The materials and parts for the V-2 were drawn from several suppliers.

Berlin-Lichtenberg plant of Siemens Planiawerke (blanks for exhaust steering vanes)
Meitingen plant of Siemens Planiawerke, near Augsburg (vane graphitizing & machining).
Voss Works at Sarstedt (nose cone)
Linke-Hoffman-Busch-Werke AG in Breslau (combustion chambers)
Weimar near the Buchenwald camp (electrical parts)
WUMAG Abt. Maschineenbau (Heinkel factory) in Jenbach (turbopump and steam generator)
Marienthal railway tunnel at Rebstock (electrical wiring and harnesses, Meillerwagen)
Petsamo, Finland (nickel in the 9% nickel steel for the low temp LOX tanks and pipes)

See also
V-1 flying bomb facilities
Bombing of Mimoyecques during World War II

References

 01
Rocket launch sites in Germany
World War II sites of Nazi Germany
Operation Crossbow